Caleb Roberts (born 24 October 2005) is a professional footballer who plays as a midfielder for  club Plymouth Argyle.

Club career
On 2 November 2021, Roberts made his first-team debut aged 16 years and nine days, in an EFL Trophy match between Plymouth Argyle and Arsenal U21s.

He made his full debut on 18 October 2022, in Argyle's 1–0 EFL Trophy win against Crystal Palace U21s. He signed his first pro-contract on his 17th birthday, and a month later played his first FA Cup game, when he featured as a substitute in Argyle's first round 5–1 loss to Grimsby Town.

On 22 November 2022, Roberts scored his first professional goal, the eventual winner in a 3–2 EFL Trophy match against Charlton Athletic.

Career statistics

References

External links

2005 births
Living people
English footballers
Association football midfielders
Plymouth Argyle F.C. players
English Football League players